Kyle Fowler (born June 7, 1992) is an American professional stock car racing driver.

Racing career
Born in Smyrna, Georgia, Fowler started racing at the age of four racing in Quarter Midget racing, competing all over the country winning numerous championships in various divisions (Sr. Honda, Lite 160 and Lite AA). At the age of eight Fowler moved to the Bandolero Series where he was the GA State Champion. At the age of twelve Fowler moved to Legends car racing at tracks such as Atlanta Motor Speedway, Charlotte Motor Speedway and many other tracks throughout the south-east and beyond. Fowler had a banner season in 2006 in which he competed for five championships in different Legends Car series around the region and won three of them and finished second in the other two.

Fowler then moved up to late model racing, competing in the GAS Series where he was the rookie of the year in 2007, where he made a big splash by posting 14 top-10 finishes in 17 starts. The season ended with a solid top-15 run in the Snowflake 100 at Five Flags Speedway where more than 75 Late Models were on hand for the biggest Pro Late Model race of the season.

2008 saw Fowler try his hand in the nationally-televised ASA Late Model Series. He scored a career-best second-place finish at Lanier National Speedway (GA) in the James Garrison Memorial 100. He backed that up with a pole position and a runner-up finish at Peach State Speedway (GA) just a few weeks later. In 2009, Fowler started off the year with another runner-up finish in the prestigious SpeedFest at Lanier National Speedway (GA). In April, he made his first-ever K&N Pro Series East start for Ken Schrader Racing.

It was on to the ARCA Racing Series in 2010 where he made five starts and had four finishes inside the top 20, while getting the chance to hone his skills with the help of veteran NASCAR driver Ken Schrader and Ken Schrader Racing.

In 2011, Fowler raced with the Venturini Motorsports team gaining 3 top-3 qualifying efforts, Fowler also led laps at Daytona International Speedway as well as at Chicagoland Speedway. However, despite these successes, the year was plagued with mechanical failures at 4 of the 5 races.

In 2012, Fowler drove in the Nationwide Series for team owner Randy Hill, running the No. 08 Ford. Hill ran a low budget team that ran with engines less powerful than their rivals. Fowler ran seven races, with a best of 21st at Texas. In 2013 Fowler drove a limited Nationwide Series schedule with Go Green Racing.

In 2014, Fowler made his Sprint Cup Series debut in the Goody's Headache Relief Shot 500 at Martinsville Speedway.

Motorsports career results

NASCAR
(key) (Bold – Pole position awarded by qualifying time. Italics – Pole position earned by points standings or practice time. * – Most laps led.)

Sprint Cup Series

Xfinity Series

Camping World Truck Series

 Season still in progress 
 not eligible for series points

Camping World East Series

ARCA Racing Series
(key) (Bold – Pole position awarded by qualifying time. Italics – Pole position earned by points standings or practice time. * – Most laps led.)

References

 http://www.hardcoreracefans.com/nascar-cup-news/6033-kyle-fowler-fastest-in-opening-arca-test

External links
  
 

Living people
1992 births
People from Smyrna, Georgia
Racing drivers from Atlanta
Racing drivers from Georgia (U.S. state)
NASCAR drivers
ARCA Menards Series drivers
Sportspeople from Cobb County, Georgia